"Rust" is a single by Echo & the Bunnymen which was released in March 1999. It was the first single to be released from their 1999 album,  What Are You Going to Do with Your Life?. It reached number 22 on the UK Singles Chart and currently remains their last UK Top 40 hit.

Overview
The single was released on London Records as a 7-inch single and as two separate CD versions. Apart from the title track, all three releases had different track listings. The two CD versions had different covers.

The title track was written by Will Sergeant and Ian McCulloch; Les Pattinson had left the band to look after his ailing mother by this time. The lyrics and melody for its chorus are borrowed from McCulloch's 1992 b-side song "Ribbons and Chains." The release was jointly produced by Alan Douglas, McCulloch, and Paul Toogood. The title track was mixed by Mark Stent while the other tracks were mixed by Mike Hunter.

Track listings
All tracks written by Will Sergeant and Ian McCulloch.

7-inch release (London LON424 and 570 394-7)
"Rust" (radio edit)
"The Fish Hook Girl"

CD No. 1 release (London LONCD424)
"Rust" (radio edit) – 4:17
"The Fish Hook Girl" – 4:39
"See the Horizon" – 4:03

CD No. 2 release (London LOCDP424)
"Rust" – 5:26
"Sense of Life" – 4:18
"Beyond the Green" – 2:43

Chart positions

Personnel
Ian McCulloch – vocals, guitar
Will Sergeant – lead guitar
Guy Pratt – bass
Jeremy Stacey – drums
Alan Douglas – producer
Ian McCulloch – producer
Paul Toogood – producer
Mark Stent – audio mixing
Mike Hunter – audio mixing

References

External links
Lyrics at MTV.com
Promotional video at the band's official website

1999 singles
Echo & the Bunnymen songs
Songs written by Ian McCulloch (singer)
Songs written by Will Sergeant
1999 songs
London Records singles